Carol Ann Shudlick Smith is an American former women's basketball player at the University of Minnesota. Shudlick played from 1990 through 1994, setting a number of school records, including a then-record 2,097 career points. Shudlick was the recipient of the 1994 Wade Trophy, given to the nation's best college basketball player.

Shudlick Smith was later honored by the NCAA by being included in a list of 209 student-athletes listed as "NCAA Women's Basketball's Finest." She also was inducted into the University of Minnesota's M Club, the school's Hall of Fame.

Minnesota statistics
Source

References

Year of birth missing (living people)
Living people
All-American college women's basketball players
American women's basketball players
Centers (basketball)
Columbus Quest players
Minnesota Golden Gophers women's basketball players
Apple Valley High School (Minnesota) alumni